Showers-Aero (also called Ben Showers Aero) was an American aerospace design firm based in Milton, Pennsylvania. The company specialized in the design of helicopters in the form of plans for amateur construction.

Ben Showers formed the company as part of his work redesigning the Adams-Wilson Choppy helicopter, a program that resulted in the single-seat Showers Skytwister or "Choppy". The Skytwister incorporated a new powerplant, the twin cylinder, liquid-cooled, two-stroke, dual-ignition  Rotax 582 powerplant with a 2.58:1 reduction drive gearbox, to replace the original A/W Choppy's motorcycle engine. The Skytwister also used a new design tail boom, cockpit and windshield. By 1998 it was reported that 200 sets of plans had been sold and 12 aircraft were flying.

Aircraft

References

Defunct aircraft manufacturers of the United States
Homebuilt aircraft
Helicopters